The 10 Cantons of the Federation of Bosnia and Herzegovina are each governed by directly elected parliaments called assemblies.  Each assembly is elected by at-large party-list proportional representation with open lists every four years at the same time as federal and entity elections.

Table
This is the state of parties in the assemblies as of 2 October 2022.

Diagrams

References

Politics of the Federation of Bosnia and Herzegovina
Political organizations based in Bosnia and Herzegovina
Bosnia and Herzogovina parliaments